A basis point (often abbreviated as bp, often pronounced as "bip" or "beep") is one hundredth of 1 percentage point. The related term permyriad means one hundredth of 1 percent. Changes of interest rates are often stated in basis points. If an interest rate of 10% increased by 1 bp, it changed to 10.01%.

Definition

10 bp = (a difference of) 0.1% or 1‰ or 10‱.
100 bp = (a difference of) 1% or 10‰ or 100‱.

Basis points are used as a convenient unit of measurement in contexts where percentage differences of less than 1% are discussed. The most common example is interest rates, where differences in interest rates of less than 1% per year are usually meaningful to talk about. For example, a difference of 0.10 percentage points is equivalent to a change of 10 basis points (e.g., a 4.67% rate increases by 10 basis points to 4.77%). In other words, an increase of 100 basis points means a rise by 1 percentage point.

Like percentage points, basis points avoid the ambiguity between relative and absolute discussions about interest rates by dealing only with the absolute change in numeric value of a rate. For example,  if a report says there has been a "1% increase" from a 10% interest rate, this could refer to an increase either from 10% to 10.1% (relative, 1% of 10%), or from 10% to 11% (absolute, 1% plus 10%).  However, if the report says there has been a "100 basis point increase" from a 10% interest rate, then the interest rate of 10% has increased by 1.00% (the absolute change) to an 11% rate.

It is common practice in the financial industry to use basis points to denote a rate change in a financial instrument, or the difference (spread) between two interest rates, including the yields of fixed-income securities.

Since certain loans and bonds may commonly be quoted in relation to some index or underlying security, they will often be quoted as a spread over (or under) the index. For example, a loan that bears interest of 0.50% per annum above the London Interbank Offered Rate (LIBOR) is said to be 50 basis points over LIBOR, which is commonly expressed as "L+50bps" or simply "L+50".

The term "basis point" has its origins in trading the "basis" or the spread between two interest rates.  Since the basis is usually small, these are quoted multiplied up by 10,000, and hence a "full point" movement in the "basis" is a basis point.  Contrast with pips in FX forward markets.

Expense ratios of investment funds are often quoted in basis points.

Permyriad
A related concept is one part per ten thousand, . The same unit is also (rarely) called a permyriad, literally meaning "for (every) myriad (ten thousand)".  If used interchangeably with basis point, the permyriad is potentially confusing because an increase of one basis point to a 10 basis point value is generally understood to mean an increase to 11 basis points; not an increase of one part in ten thousand, meaning an increase to 10.001 basis points. This is akin to the difference between percentage and percentage point.

Unicode
(It can be regarded as a stylized form of the four zeros in the denominator of "", although it originates as a natural extension of the percent  and permille  signs.)

Related units 
 Percentage point difference of 1 part in 100
 Percentage (%) 1 part in 100
 Per mille (‰) 1 part in 1,000
 Per cent mille (pcm) 1 part in 100,000
 Parts per million (ppm) 1 part in 1,000,000

See also 
 Parts-per notation
 Per-unit system
 Percent point function
Tick size

References

External links

 
Fixed income
Typographical symbols
Interest rates
Operations of central banks